Wissington in Norfolk is the site of British Sugar's largest refinery in the UK; it is also the largest in Europe. There has been a sugar factory there since 1925; however none of the rest of the village remains, other than the name. British Sugar has opened the UK's first bioethanol plant here.

History
When the factory was built in 1925, there was no road access to it. It was located on the south bank of the River Wissey, and was also served by the Wissington Light Railway. This railway had been built in 1905, and opened in 1906, for the benefit of local farms. It left the Denver (on the Great Eastern Main Line, the Fen Line) to Stoke Ferry Railway at Abbey Junction, which was located near Station Farm. The line was unusual, in that it was not authorised either by an Act of Parliament or by a Light Railway Order. The owners of the factory leased the line, and built another  of track, which ensured that sugar beet could reach the plant in sufficient volume to make it efficient.

In addition to the railway transport, three tugs, named Hilgay, Littleport and Wissington, were used to transport goods from the factory to King's Lynn and coal from King's Lynn to the factory in a fleet of 24 steel barges. The Ministry of Agriculture deemed that the factory was of strategic importance during World War II, and took responsibility for it from March 1941. They drafted in Italian prisoners of war to refurbish the railway, and to construct the first roads to the factory. River traffic ceased in 1943. After the war, the Ministry bought the railway in 1947, and ran it themselves. In 1957 they closed the lines to the south of the factory, as most sugar beet was by then delivered to the factory by road. Final closure came in 1982 when improvements to the line (by this point operation was between Denver near Downham Market and Wissington) were required.

One of the steam engines is now preserved on the North Norfolk Railway Hudswell Clarke no.1700 'Wissington', another Hudswell Clarke, no.1539 'Derek Crouch' on the Nene Valley Railway and the third one, a Manning Wardle no. 1532 'Newcastle', is preserved at Beamish Museum.

Today
The plant is now supplied by lorry, collecting product from  radius. In 2007, Wissington was the site of the UK's first bioethanol power plant, the excess heat from which was used to heat on-site greenhouses that produced 70 million tomatoes each year; in 2017, the greenhouses switched to producing cannabis plants for medicine production.

References

External links

British Sugar information on Wissington

Former populated places in Norfolk
Manufacturing plants in England
Economy of Norfolk
Biofuel power stations in England
Power stations in the East of England
Industrial railways in England
Sugar refineries